Danny Chavez (born March 14, 1987) is an American mixed martial artist who competes in Featherweight division. A progessional since 2010, he most notably fought in the Ultimate Fighting Championship (UFC).

Background
Born in Queens, New York, When he was five years old he went to live in Miami. Two years later he went to Bogotá to live with his father. He lived there until he was 14 in the neighbourhood of Kennedy. He picked up mixed martial arts at the age of 19, when his friend Alex Bermudez showed himThe Ultimate Fighter: Season 3. After enjoying the show, he searched through the Yellow Pages for a school and found one that was advertising Muay Thai, Jiu-Jitsu, and wrestling. After two years, a friend told him about a school and that’s when he joined MMA Masters.

Mixed martial arts career

Early career 
Starting his career in 2010, Chavez started out his professional career fighting on the regional Florida scene, being selected to compete in the Championship Fighting Alliance Undefeated Featherweight Tournament after three straight wins to start his career, including an unanimous decision win in his CFA debut against Justin Steave at CFA 3: Howard vs. Olson on October 9, 2011.

Chavez next faced Humberto Rodriguez at CFA 4: Izquierdo vs. Cenoble on December 17, 2011, in the semifinal round of the promotions undefeated featherweight tournament. He won the fight via unanimous decision to secure his place in the finals.

Chavez faced off against Jordan Parsons in the finals, which took place at CFA 5: Chavez vs. Parsons on February 24, 2012 for the featherweight title. He lost the fight via unanimous decision after five rounds.

He would continue fighting on the Florida scene, picking up three straight decision wins, before dropping two straight fights in 2016. Chavez did not see any action in 2017 but later returned in 2018 to start his three-fight win streak which were all won by knockout inside the first round, culminating in Chavez fighting under the Global Legion Fighting Championship promotion, in which he knocked out Dylan Cala to become the new GLFC featherweight champion.

Ultimate Fighting Championship
In his UFC debut, Chavez faced T.J. Brown at UFC 252 on August 15, 2020. He won the bout via unanimous decision.

In his sophomore appearance in the organization, Chavez faced Jared Gordon on February 20, 2021 at UFC Fight Night 185. At the weigh-ins, Gordon weighed in at 150 pounds, four pounds over the featherweight non-title fight limit. Gordon was fined 30% of his purse which went to Chavez and the bout proceeded at catchweight. Chavez lost the fight via unanimous decision.

Chavez was scheduled to face Doo Ho Choi on July 31, 2021 at UFC on ESPN 28. However, Choi had to pull out of the bout due to injury and was replaced by Kai Kamaka III. The fight ended up with the result of majority draw.

Chavez faced Ricardo Ramos at UFC on ESPN: Kattar vs. Emmett on June 18, 2022.  He lost the bout in the first round, getting knocked out with a spinning back elbow.

On August 8, 2022, it was announced that Chavez was no longer on the UFC roster.

Championships and accomplishments

 Global Legion FC
 GLFC Featherweight Championship (One time)

Mixed martial arts record

|-
|Loss
|align=center|11–5–1
|Ricardo Ramos
|KO (spinning back elbow)
|UFC on ESPN: Kattar vs. Emmett
|
|align=center|1
|align=center|1:12
|Austin, Texas, United States
|
|-
|Draw
|align=center|11–4–1
|Kai Kamaka III
|Draw (majority)
|UFC on ESPN: Hall vs. Strickland
|
|align=center|3
|align=center|5:00
|Las Vegas, Nevada, United States
|
|-
|Loss
|align=center|11–4
|Jared Gordon
|Decision (unanimous)
|UFC Fight Night: Blaydes vs. Lewis 
|
|align=center|3
|align=center|5:00
|Las Vegas, Nevada, United States
| 
|-
| Win
| align=center| 11–3
| T.J. Brown
| Decision (unanimous)
| UFC 252
| 
| align=center| 3
| align=center| 5:00
| Las Vegas, Nevada, United States
| 
|-
| Win
| align=center| 10–3
| Dylan Cala
| KO
| Global Legion FC 14
| 
| align=center| 1
| align=center| 2:24
| Clearwater, Florida, United States
| 
|-
| Win
| align=center| 9–3
| Felipe Vargas
|TKO (head kick)
|XFN 22
|
|align=center|1
|align=center|2:50
|Fort Lauderdale, Florida, United States
| 
|-
| Win
| align=center| 8–3
| Leandro Magalhães
| KO (punches)
| Shogun Fights
| 
| align=center| 1
| align=center| 4:08
| Hollywood, Florida, United States
|
|-
| Loss
| align=center| 7–3
|Adi Alić
| Decision (unanimous)
| Fight Time 31
| 
| align=center| 3
| align=center| 5:00
|Miami, Florida, United States
|
|-
| Loss
| align=center| 7–2
|Jason Soares
|Submission (guillotine choke)
|Fight Time 29
|
|align=center|5
|align=center|2:32
|Miami, Florida, United States
|
|-
| Win
| align=center| 7–1
| John De Jesus
|Decision (unanimous)
|Fight Time 27
|
|align=center|3
|align=center|5:00
|Miami, Florida, United States
|
|-
| Win
| align=center| 6–1
| Anderson Hutchinson
| Decision (split)
| HOF: Nations Collide
| 
| align=center| 3
| align=center| 5:00
|Coral Gables, Florida, United States
|
|-
| Win
| align=center| 5–1
| Chino Duran
| Decision (unanimous)
| CFA 8: Araujo vs. Bradley
| 
| align=center| 3
| align=center| 5:00
| Miami, Florida, United States
| 
|-
| Loss
| align=center| 4–1
|Jordan Parsons
|Decision (unanimous)
|CFA 5: Chavez vs. Parsons
|
|align=center|5
|align=center|5:00
|Miami, Florida, United States
|
|-
| Win
| align=center| 4–0
| Humberto Rodriguez
| Decision (unanimous)
| CFA 4: Izquierdo vs. Cenoble
| 
|align=center|3
|align=center|5:00
| Miami, Florida, United States
| 
|-
| Win
| align=center| 3–0
| Justin Steave
| Decision (unanimous)
| CFA 3: Howard vs Olson
| 
| align=center| 3
| align=center| 5:00
|Miami, Florida, United States
| 
|-
| Win
| align=center| 2–0
| Casey Phelps
| Decision (unanimous)
| Mixed Fighting Alliance 5
| 
| align=center| 3
| align=center| 5:00
|Miami, Florida, United States
| 
|-
| Win
| align=center| 1–0
| Nelson Lopez
| Decision (unanimous)
| G-Force Fights 3
| 
| align=center| 3
| align=center| 5:00
| Miami, Florida, United States
|

See also
List of male mixed martial artists
Cage Fury Fighting Championships

References

External links
 
 

Living people
1987 births
Colombian male mixed martial artists
Featherweight mixed martial artists
Mixed martial artists utilizing Brazilian jiu-jitsu
Ultimate Fighting Championship male fighters
Colombian practitioners of Brazilian jiu-jitsu
People awarded a black belt in Brazilian jiu-jitsu